Sosnovka is a rural locality (a settlement) in Chazyovskoye Rural Settlement, Kosinsky District, Perm Krai, Russia. The population was 182 as of 2010. There are 5 streets.

Geography 
Sosnovka is located 20 km west of Kosa (the district's administrative centre) by road. Verkh-Lel is the nearest rural locality.

References 

Rural localities in Kosinsky District